Denys Molchanov and Igor Zelenay were the defending champions but chose not to defend their title.

Tomislav Brkić and Ante Pavić won the title after defeating Nikola Čačić and Antonio Šančić 6–2, 6–3 in the final.

Seeds

Draw

References

External links
 Main draw

Internazionali di Tennis del Friuli Venezia Giulia - Doubles
2019 Doubles
Friuli